Ardashir was a Sasanian prince, who ruled Marv from ca. 240 to 262. He was either a brother or son of the Sasanian king Ardashir I (r. 224-242), who had installed him as the ruler of Marv, which was the outpost of his empire in the north-east.

Sources 
 

3rd-century deaths
Year of birth unknown
3rd-century Iranian people
Sasanian princes
Vassal rulers of the Sasanian Empire
Governors of the Sasanian Empire
History of Turkmenistan
Rulers of Khorasan